Çardakbağı is a neighborhood of Akyurt District, Ankara Province, Turkey.

References

Populated places in Ankara Province
Akyurt
Neighbourhoods of Akyurt